Marko Vidojković (born 1 October 1975) is a Serbian novelist. He is best known for his novels Kandže, Sve crvenkape su iste and Urednik. For his writings, he is the recipient of the Vital Award, the Golden Bestseller and Kočić's pen.

He hosted the satirical talk show 390 stepeni on ATV Banja Luka. He is the co-host of Dobar, loš, zao on Nova S.

Bibliography
 Ples sitnih demona (The Dance of Small-Time Demons, a novel) (Narodna knjiga, 2001, Samizdat B92, 2005, Laguna, 2019)
 Đavo je moj drug (The Devil Is a Friend of Mine, a novel) (Narodna knjiga, 2002, Samizdat, 2005, Laguna, 2015)
 Pikavci na plaži (Butts on the Beach, a novel) (Narodna knjiga, 2002, Laguna 2018)
 Kandže (The Claws, a novel) (Samizdat, 2004, Laguna, 2020)
 Sve crvenkape su iste (All Red Riding Hoods Are the Same, a novel) (Samizdat, 2006, Laguna, 2016)
 Bog ti pomogo ( May God Have Mercy on Your Soul, short stories collection, Samizdat, 2007, Laguna, 2015)
 Hoću da mi se nešto lepo desi odmah (I Want Something Nice to Happen to Me Right Now, a novel) (Samizdat, 2009)
 Kandže 2 - Diler i smrt (The Claws 2 - The Pusher and Death, a novel) (Rende, 2012, Laguna, 2020)
 Urednik (The Editor, a novel) (Laguna, 2014)
 Priče s Dijagnozom (Diagnozed Stories) (Laguna, 2015)
 E baš vam hvala, (Thanks a Lot, a novel Laguna, 2017)
 Đubre, (Trash, a novel, Laguna, 2020)
Kovid 19+ (short stories collection, Laguna, 2021)

References

External links
 Mihailo Pantić's review on The Red Riding Hoods
 Marko Vidojković: Kremplji Mladina, 19. August 2006 

Living people
Serbian novelists
Serbian male short story writers
Serbian short story writers
1975 births
Writers from Belgrade